The 1960–61 UCLA Bruins men's basketball team represented the University of California, Los Angeles during the 1960–61 NCAA men's basketball season and were members of the Pacific Coast Conference. The Bruins were led by 13th year head coach John Wooden. They finished the regular season with a record of 18–8 and finished second in the AAWU with a record of 7–5.

Previous season

The Bruins finished the regular season with a record of 14–12 and finished second in the PCC with a record of 7–5. After spending the previous five years at the Pan-Pacific Auditorium, UCLA moved to the new Los Angeles Memorial Sports Arena prior the season.

Roster

Schedule

|-
!colspan=9 style=|Regular Season

Source

References

UCLA Bruins men's basketball seasons
UCLA
UCLA Bruins Basketball
UCLA Bruins Basketball